Sunrisers Hyderabad (SRH) are a franchise cricket team based in Hyderabad, India, which plays in Indian Premier League(IPL). Sunrisers Hyderabad made their IPL debut replacing Deccan Chargers in 2013 Indian Premier League. Kumar Sangakkara was initially appointed as the captain of the Sunrisers Hyderabad but was replaced by Cameron White after nine matches as the latter captained the team for the remaining 7 matches and the Eliminator match in the Playoffs. The team was coached by Tom Moody with Waqar Younis as their bowling coach while V. V. S. Laxman and Kris Srikkanth were appointed as the mentors. The team played all their home games at home in Hyderabad.

In their inaugural season, Sunrisers started their campaign against Pune Warriors India on 5 April 2013 at Hyderabad on a winning note and the team reached the playoffs but were eliminated after losing the eliminator match against Rajasthan Royals by 4 wickets at Feroz Shah Kotla in Delhi on 22 May 2013. They got selected for 2013 Champions League Twenty20 but got knocked out in the group stages.

Background
The team was named as the Sunrisers Hyderabad which replaced the Chargers and debuted in the 2013 season. The team logo was unveiled on 20 December 2012, along with the announcement that the team's management would be led by Kris Srikkanth, Tom Moody and V. V. S. Laxman. Waqar Younis and Simon Helmot later joined the coaching staff as bowling coach and assistant coach respectively. The team jersey was unveiled on 8 March 2013, and the team anthem composed by G. V. Prakash Kumar was released on 12 March 2013.

Players Acquisition

The players auction for the 2013 Indian Premier League held on 3 February 2013 at Chennai. All nine franchises had participated in the auction. SRH has retained 20 players from Deccan Chargers and released 13 players in November 2012. This leaves Sunrisers with Salary cap remaining of $7mn and have 14 Indian and 6 Overseas players. Sunrisers later added 11 players to the team including 6 capped players during IPL-2013 auction.

They opened their account at 2013 auction by buying South-African wicket-keeper Quinton de Kock at base price of $20,000. They also got two overseas bowling options in the form of right-arm Australian fast-bowler Clint McKay and right-arm off-spinner Nathan McCullum, both at their base price of $100,000. Their most expensive buy in their maiden IPL auction came in with the purchase of Sri-Lankan all-rounder Thisara Perera at a whooping price of $675,000. They also bagged West-Indian all-rounder Darren Sammy for $425,000 to improve their options for the squad. Towards the end, they picked up Sudeep Tyagi, their only Indian purchase at the base price of $100,000.

Post auction, Sunrisers signed Hanuma Vihari, Hyderabad local boy and member of the India Under-19 cricket team that won the 2012 ICC Under-19 Cricket World Cup in Australia. They bought leg-spinner Karn Sharma, all-rounders Padmanabhan Prasanth and Sachin Rana and batsman Thalaivan Sargunam to improve their squad depth. The Sunrisers announced their final squad of 27 players before the tournament releasing the others.

Retained Players: Akshath Reddy, Amit Mishra, Anand Rajan, Ankit Sharma, Ashish Reddy, Biplab Samantray, Dwaraka Ravi Teja, Ishant Sharma, Parthiv Patel, Shikhar Dhawan, Veer Pratap Singh, Cameron White, Chris Lynn, Dale Steyn, Kumar Sangakkara, JP Duminy

Released Players: Abhishek Jhunjhunwala, Akash Bhandari, Arjun Yadav, Bharat Chipli, Darren Bravo, Daniel Christian, Daniel Harris, Ishank Jaggi, Kedar Devdhar, Manpreet Gony, Rusty Theron, Sneha Kishore, Sunny Sohal, Syed Quadri, Tanmay Mishra, Tanmay Srivastava, TP Sudhindra, Tekkami Atchuta Rao

Added Players: Darren Sammy, Hanuma Vihari, Karn Sharma, Nathan McCullum, Padmanabhan Prasanth, Quinton de Kock, Sachin Rana, Sudeep Tyagi, Thalaivan Sargunam, Thisara Perera, Clint McKay

Squad 
 Players with international caps are listed in bold.
 Signed Year denotes year from which player is associated with Sunrisers Hyderabad

Administration and support staff

Kit Manufacturers and Sponsors

Season Overview

Indian Premier League

Group Stage
The Sunrisers Hyderabad started their campaign at home on a winning note defeating the Pune Warriors by 22 runs in a low-scoring match. Amit Mishra was adjudged man of the match for his contribution of 3/19 in four overs. The Sunrisers also won their second match at home, another low-scoring thriller, against the Royal Challengers Bangalore in the Super Over by five runs after both teams tied on total-score of 130 in 20 overs. Hanuma Vihari was awarded man of the match for his unbeaten match winning knock of 44 in 46 balls. The Sunrisers suffered their first defeat against the same opponent in a high-scoring away match when they faced each other two days later. Cameron White scored the first half-century for the Sunrisers to help the team post a challenging total of 161 in 20 overs but Royal Challengers' captain, Virat Kohli's unbeaten knock of 93 in 47 balls completed the chase for the Royal Challengers. Later, the Sunrisers won their first away match against the Delhi Daredevils by three wickets with Mishra contributing again in the Sunrisers' win with 1/15 in four overs and an unbeaten 16 off 14 balls. The Sunrisers lost to the Kolkata Knight Riders in an away tie by 48 runs where Gautam Gambhir's side outscoring the Sunrisers with skipper himself winning man of the match for his knock of 53 in 45 balls. The Sunrisers successfully defended their low-total of 119 against the Warriors in an away tie with Mishra winning his third man of the award for his all-round performance of scoring 30 runs and taking 4/19 in four overs. He also created a record of being the first player to take hat-trick for the Sunrisers and also the first player to take three hat-tricks in the Indian Premier League. This win also helped the Sunrisers achieve their first double this season by winning their both encounters against the Warriors. The Sunrisers extended their winning streak in home games to three with another win against the Kings XI Punjab. Vihari helped the Sunrisers chase the total of 124 in just 18.5 overs with five wickets to spare for which he was awarded the man of the match. The Sunrisers lost their next match to the Chennai Super Kings by five wickets as the match-winning knock of an unbeaten 67 off 37 balls by their captain MS Dhoni won him the man of the match award.

The Sunrisers were completely outplayed by the Rajasthan Royals in an away match with Royals successfully completing the chase of 145 in just 17 overs with eight wickets in hand with Shane Watson winning the man of the match award for his unbeaten knock of 98 in 53 balls. Returning to their home, the Sunrisers extended their winning streak at home to five with the wins against the Mumbai Indians and the Daredevils. Ishant Sharma's bowling effort of 2/15 in four overs and Shikhar Dhawan's unbeaten knock of 73 helped the Sunrisers beat the Mumbai Indians by seven wickets with Sharma winning the man of the match while a collective bowling effort by Sunrisers' bowlers helped them bowl-out the Daredevils for just 80 runs in 19.1 overs as the Sunrisers successfully completed their chase in just 13.5 overs with six wickets in hand. Darren Sammy's all-round performance of 2/10 in three overs and unbeaten knock of 18 in 20 balls got his first man of the match award for the Sunrisers in the match against the Daredevils as this win also helped the Sunrisers knock the Daredevils out of the tournament and complete the double over them, their second double in this season. But, their winning streak at home were halted by the Super Kings with an unbeaten match-winning knock of 99 in 52 balls by Suresh Raina helped the Super Kings beat the Sunrisers by 77 runs which also won him the man of the match award. This loss resulted in the Super Kings complete their double over Sunrisers in this season. The Sunrisers bounced back strongly winning against the Kings XI Punjab and completing the double over them, their third this season. Parthiv Patel's score of 61 in 47 runs helped the Sunrisers post total of 150/7 in 20 overs while Sammy's bowling contribution of 4/22 in four overs completed the win for the Sunrisers by 30 runs. Patel won the man of the match award. The Sunrisers later lost to the Mumbai Indians by seven wickets as an unbeaten knock of 66 in 27 balls by Kieron Pollard earned him the man of the match. With two wins needed in next two matches to qualify for the playoffs, the Sunrisers made most of their home advantage to beat the Royals. The Sunrisers set target of 137 with Biplab Samantray scoring 55 in 46 balls and later they restricted the Royals to just 113 to win the match by 23 runs with Mishra winning the man of the match award for his contribution of 2/8 in four overs. The Sunrisers defeated the Knight Riders in their last home match of the season by five wickets with Patel scoring 47 in 37 balls which also won him the man of the match award. This win helped Sunrisers finish fourth in the league table and qualify for playoffs in their maiden season in the IPL.
Playoff Stage
The Sunrisers were knocked out of the tournament in the eliminator against the Royals in Delhi. The Sunrisers won the toss and posted modest score of 132/7 in 20 overs with Dhawan scoring 33 in 39 balls. The Royals successfully chased the target with four wickets in hand and four balls to spare as Brad Hodge won the man of the match for his unbeaten knock of 54 in 29 balls.

Competitions

Indian Premier League

Summary

Group stage

Results by match

Knockout stage

Brackets

Fixtures

Group stage

Knockout stage
Eliminator

Champions League Twenty20

Summary

Qualifying stage

Standings

  advanced to the group stage

Group stage

Standings – Group B

  advanced to the knockout stage

Fixtures

All times are in Indian Standard Time (UTC+05:30)

Qualifying stage

Group stage

Statistics 

IPL Statistics Full Table on Cricinfo
 Last updated: 26 Oct 2017

Awards and achievements

Player of the match awards

Achievements
2013 Indian Premier League
 Reached Playoff Stage in their debut season
 Amit Mishra took a hat-trick against Pune Warriors 
 Most Economic Bowler : Anand Rajan (5.25)
 Most Dot Balls Bowled : Dale Steyn (211)

2013 Champions League
 Qualified to Group Stage from Qualifying Stage

See also
List of Sunrisers Hyderabad records

References

External links
Sunrisers Hyderabad official website

2013 Indian Premier League
Sunrisers Hyderabad seasons
Cricket in Hyderabad, India